

P
 PACY - Prairie Central Railway
 PAE  - Peoria and Eastern Railway; Conrail
 PAL  - Paducah and Louisville Railway
 PAM  - Pittsburgh, Allegheny and McKees Rocks Railroad
 PARX - Pan American Railway Company
 PARY - Prairie Trunk Railway
 PAS  - Pan Am Southern
 PAUT - Pennsylvania and Atlantic Railroad; Conrail
 PBFX - IBP, Inc.; Tyson Foods
 PBL  - Philadelphia Belt Line Railroad
 PBLX - Pillsbury
 PBNE - Philadelphia, Bethlehem and New England Railroad
 PBR  - Patapsco and Back Rivers Railroad
 PBRR - Prairie Belt Railroad
 PBVR - Port Bienville Railroad
 PC   - Penn Central; Norfolk Southern
 PCA  - Penn Central; Norfolk Southern
 PCB  - Penn Central; Norfolk Southern
 PCCX - Peabody Coal Company
 PCEX - GE Rail Services
 PCFX - Pacific Car and Foundry Company
 PCIX - Shippers Car Line; ACF Industries
 PCMX - Petro-Chem Marketing Company
 PCN  - Point Comfort and Northern Railway
 PCRC - Panama Canal Railway Company; Kansas City Southern Railway
 PCSX - GE Rail Services
 PCTX - Pioneer Cement Company of Texas
 PCY  - Pittsburgh, Chartiers and Youghiogheny Railway
 PDQX - Castle Capital Corporation
 PE   - Pacific Electric Railway; Conrail
 PECX - Pekin Energy Company
 PENX - Penford Products Company
 PEPX - Potomac Electric Power Company
 PER  - Port Everglades Railway
 PF   - Pioneer and Fayette Railroad
 PFE  - Pacific Fruit Express; Union Pacific Railroad
 PFM  - Power, Fluid & Metals
 PGDX - Procter and Gamble Manufacturing Company
 PGE  - Pacific Great Eastern Railway; British Columbia Railway; Canadian National Railway
 PGER - Pacific Great Eastern Railway; British Columbia Railway; Canadian National Railway
 PGEX - Portland General Electric Company
 PGHX - Trinity Rail Management, Inc.
 PGMX - Procter and Gamble Manufacturing Company
 PGR  - Progressive Rail
 PHCR - Port Colborne Harbour Railway
 PHD  - Port Huron and Detroit Railroad; Chessie System; CSX Transportation
 PHL  - Pacific Harbor Line
 PI   - Paducah and Illinois Railroad
 PICK - Pickens Railroad
 PJR  - Port Jersey Railroad
 PLCX - Pullman Leasing Company; GE Capital Railcar Services
 PLE  - Pittsburgh and Lake Erie Railroad; New York Central Railroad; Penn Central; Conrail; CSX Transportation (after Conrail breakup)
 PLEX - PLM, Inc.
 PLLU - Polynesia Line
 PLLZ - Polynesia Line
 PLMX - PLM International
 PLWX - GE Capital Railcar Services
 PM   - Pere Marquette Railway; Chesapeake and Ohio Railway; Chessie System; CSX Transportation
 PMLX - Prairie Malt, Ltd.

 PMRX - Progress Metal Reclamation Company

 PN - Piedmont and Northern Railway; Seaboard Coast Line; CSX Transportation
 PN - Pennsylvania Northeastern Railroad
 PNRW - Piedmont and Northern Railway (division of Patriot Rail Corporation)
 PNWR - Portland and Western Railroad
 POHC - Pittsburgh and Ohio Central Railroad
 POTB - Port of Tillamook Bay Railroad
 PPAX - PCS Phosphate Company
 PPCX - American Association of Private Railroad Car Owners
 PPGX - PPG Industries, Inc.
 PPHX - PCS Phosphate Company
 PPLX - Pennsylvania Power and Light Company
 PPNX - PCS Phosphate Company
 PPRX - Phillips Petroleum Company
 PPU  - Peoria and Pekin Union Railway
 PRCX - 20th Century Fox
 PRGX - ProGold, LLC
 PRL  - Penn Eastern Rail Lines, Inc.; East Penn Railway
 PRLX - Progress Rail Services Corporation
 PRMU - Puerto Rican Maritime Shipping Authority
 PROX - Procor
 PRR  - Pennsylvania Railroad; Penn Central; Norfolk Southern
 PRRX - Norfolk Southern
 PRSL - Pennsylvania-Reading Seashore Lines; Norfolk Southern
 PRSX - Progress Rail Services Corporation
 PS   - Pittsburg and Shawmut Railroad
 PSCX - Public Service Company of Colorado
 PSL  - Peabody Short Line; Illinois Central Railroad; Canadian National Railways
 PSPX - Phillips Petroleum Company
 PSR  - Pittsburg and Shawmut Railroad
 PTM   - Portland Terminal Company; Maine Central Railroad; Pan Am Railways
 PTEX - Canpotex
 PTLX - Pullman Transport Leasing; GE Rail Services
 PVVR - Portland, Vancouver and Vitebsk Seaway Railroad; Spokane, Portland and Seattle Railway; Burlington Northern Railroad
 PW   - Providence and Worcester Railroad

P